Lorenzo Lunadei (born 12 July 1997) is a Sammarinese footballer who currently plays as a midfielder for La Fiorita.

Club career
Lunadei started his career with the FYA Riccione youth academy, where he made 60 appearances, before joining Campionato Sammarinese di Calcio side La Fiorita in 2017.

International career
Lunadei made his senior international debut against Andorra in a 2-0 loss. He was replaced at half time by Luca Tosi. He has also been called up to the San Marino under 21 side.

Career statistics

Club

Notes

International

References

1997 births
Living people
Sammarinese footballers
San Marino international footballers
Association football midfielders
S.P. La Fiorita players